Football Club Twente is a Dutch professional football club from the city of Enschede, sometimes known internationally as Twente Enschede. The club was formed in 1965 by the merger of 1926 Dutch champions Sportclub Enschede with Enschedese Boys. It was the holder of the 2011 KNVB Cup and Johan Cruyff Shield trophies, and was Eredivisie champion in the 2009–10 season; the club has also finished as Eredivisie runner-up twice, was runner-up in the 1974–75 UEFA Cup, and has won the KNVB Cup three times. Twente's home ground since 1998 is De Grolsch Veste. Since 2019, the team have played in the Eredivisie, the top division of Dutch football.

History

Foundation and early years 
The club was formed in 1965 as a merger of two professional clubs, Sportclub Enschede and the Enschedese Boys. One of such predecessors, SC Enschede, had also won a single Dutch championship in 1926.

The first successes of the club started just after the merger of 1965, under the innovative coach Kees Rijvers. Twente finished third in 1969, fourth in 1970, fifth in 1971, third in 1972 and again in 1973. The team's key figures were local heroes, such as Epi Drost, Eddy Achterberg, Kick van der Vall and Theo Pahlplatz. Their finest Eredivisie season was 1973–74, in which Twente battled for the Dutch championship with Feyenoord. A head-to-head confrontation in the final game of the season, in Rotterdam, where Feyenoord prevailed 3–2, sealed Twente's fate in second. Nonetheless, this earned the side a position in the UEFA Cup.

The Tukkers (as people from the Dutch region of Twente are generally called) nearly made the very most out of that UEFA Cup ticket—after beating Juventus in the semi-finals, Twente lost to German side Borussia Mönchengladbach in the finals (0–0, 1–5).

In 1977, Twente won its first trophy, the KNVB Cup, after beating PEC Zwolle 3–0.

The 1980s and 1990s 
After enjoying some success in the 1970s, prospects went downhill for Twente, with the club ultimately suffering relegation to the Eerste Divisie, the Dutch second division, in 1983. However, Twente returned to the top flight a year later, but the club soon became known for their "impressive" amount of 1–1 and 0–0 draws. This new reputation as "boring Twente" overshadowed the fact that the club kept qualifying for European football on a fairly regular basis, with five times since 1985.

Re-establishment then followed in the 1990s: German coach Hans Meyer led Twente to third-place in the Eredivisie of 1997 and into the third round of the 1997–98 UEFA Cup the next season. On 24 May 2001, Twente clinched their second triumph in the KNVB Cup after beating PSV in the final after being 3–1 down in the penalty shoot-out. The season after, Twente crashed out of the Cup at the hands of Ajax's second team. Additionally, results in the league were poor, with hardcore Twente fans Ultras Vak-P eventually going on a rampage at the club's brand-new stadium, De Grolsch Veste, out of frustration.

From bankruptcy to national champions (2002–2011) 

The club's mother corporation (FC Twente '65) was declared bankrupt in the 2002–03 season, almost leading to the club's going out of existence. The club, now chaired by ambitious businessman Joop Munsterman, survived such problems and made it to another KNVB Cup final in 2004, and then finished in fourth place in the league table in 2006–07. In the 2007–08 season, Twente placed fourth and won the play-offs for a ticket to the Champions League qualifiers by defeating Ajax in the play-off finals.

In the 2008–09 season, Twente hired former England manager Steve McClaren as its new head coach. Under his tenure, unseeded Twente entered the draw for the third qualifying round of the Champions League, being drawn against seeded Arsenal. The two legs were played at home on 13 August and away on 27 August 2008. Twente lost 6–0 on aggregate, resulting in their elimination from the Champions League and subsequent entry of the 2008–09 UEFA Cup first round. At the domestic level, Twente finished second in the Eredivisie, 11 points behind champions AZ, and again secured entry to the Champions League qualifying rounds as Dutch runners-up, as well as KNVB Cup finalists (defeated by Heerenveen).

The 2009–10 season started with Twente being knocked out of the 2009–10 UEFA Champions League third qualifying round after a 1–1 aggregate draw against Sporting CP, which sent the Portuguese side through on away goals. The club was then admitted to the Europa League, where it enjoyed a relatively successful path that ended in a 4–2 aggregate defeat at the hands of Werder Bremen in the round of 32. At the domestic level, Twente won its first Eredivisie title at the end of a campaign in which they lost just twice, winning 16 of 17 at home. The championship was confirmed on the final day of the season when they beat NAC 2–0 away, making Steve McClaren the first Englishman to guide a Dutch team to a national title since Bobby Robson in 1992. The victory qualified Twente for the 2010–11 UEFA Champions League group stage, the club's first appearance in the competition. At the end of the season, McClaren resigned as the manager, moving to German side VfL Wolfsburg, and was replaced by the Belgian Michel Preud'homme. Twente continued their success by having a good run during the 2010–11 KNVB Cup, reaching the final on 8 May 2011 at De Kuip. Twente recovered from  down to defeat Ajax 3–2 in extra time with a winner from Marc Janko, which claimed the club's third KNVB Cup title. One week later, the two teams faced each other in Amsterdam in the final round of matches in the Eredivisie, with Twente leading by a point. However, Ajax gained revenge for the Cup defeat by winning 3–1, to claim their first title in seven years.

The start of the 2011–12 season, under Preud'homme's successor Co Adriaanse, featured another clash between the duo in the Amsterdam Arena, this time with Twente winning 2–1 in their second successive Johan Cruijff Shield supercup victory.

Financial problems and relegation (2014–2019)
During the 2014–15 Eredivisie season, Twente found themselves in financial trouble again, forcing the Royal Dutch Football Association (KNVB) to deduct the club three points from the side in March 2015. Club President Munsterman, who had announced to leave the club at the end of the season, then already quit the club on 1 April 2015 over allegations of financial mismanagement. The team fired 18 employees and stopped with their scouting department after they received a second three-point penalty in April 2015. They also decided to withdraw Jong Twente from the Eerste Divisie for the 2015–16 season and the women's professional team was relocated in a separate foundation. On 18 May 2016 the KNVB declared its intent to relegate FC Twente to the Eerste Divisie. This was however still subject to appeal by FC Twente and on 17 June 2016 the KNVB appeal committee decided that Twente can remain in the Eredivisie. At the end of the 2017–18 Eredivisie season, Twente relegated to the Eerste Divisie by finishing at the bottom of the table at the end of the season, after having fired two managers that season. The 2018–19 Eerste Divisie season was the first outside of the top flight for 34 years. Commercial director Jan van Halst felt partly responsible and then stepped down.

Back to Europe
In the Eerste Divisie, Twente had a season marked by ups and downs. From December 2018, however, through a 15-game stretch, not a single loss was recorded, giving the club a big lead over the competition. On 22 April 2019, the title and promotion were secured. Twente drew 0–0 at home against Jong AZ, but because the last remaining competitor Sparta Rotterdam lost, Twente could no longer be reached.

Despite promotion, manager Marino Pušić was dismissed and his assistant Gonzalo García was promoted to head coach and was put in charge of Twente's first season back in the Eredivisie. After a strong start, a 3–2 home defeat to archrivals Heracles Almelo was the start of a lesser period. Twente dropped to the bottom regions of the Eredivisie and after an impressive victory over AZ, three more defeats followed. However, after a 1–0 defeat against Vitesse, the Eredivisie season was abandoned due to the COVID-19 pandemic in the Netherlands. As a result, Twente finished the 2019–20 season in fourteenth place, safe of relegation.

At the beginning of the 2020–21 season, García was also dismissed to be succeeded by the experienced Ron Jans. At the same time, Jan Streuer became technical director as a replacement for the Ted van Leeuwen who had resigned. Streuer brought in players such as Queensy Menig and Václav Černý, who would both become key players in the following season. After an excellent first half of the season, the results in the second half of the season were disappointing. Twente missed play-offs for European football and finished in tenth place. As a result of this season, Streuer wanted to bring more experienced players to the club, and signed Robin Pröpper and Ricky van Wolfswinkel. In addition, youth players were increasingly integrated in the first team with Mees Hilgers, Ramiz Zerrouki and Daan Rots becoming starters. Jody Lukoki was also signed, but he was seriously injured shortly after his arrival, which meant that he never played a match for Twente. Lukoki's contract was terminated on 17 February 2022 after being convicted of domestic violence.  Three months later, on 9 May 2022, Lukoki died of cardiac arrest after being beaten by family members.

After a strong season, Twente finished in fourth place in the league table and qualified for the third qualifying round of the 2022–23 UEFA Europa Conference League; their first return to Europe in eight years.

Affiliated clubs
The following clubs are affiliated with Twente:

  Dayton Dutch Lions
  Qarabağ
  Kozármisleny
  Heracles Almelo
  Go Ahead Eagles
 Stranraer

Stadium 

De Grolsch Veste, formerly named Arke Stadion, is the official stadium of FC Twente and is owned by the club. It is located at the Business & Science Park, near the University of Twente and between the city centers of Enschede and Hengelo. It has a spectator capacity of 30,205 with a standard pitch heating system and has a promenade instead of fences around the stands.

De Grolsch Veste replaced the old Diekman Stadion as Twente's home ground on 22 March 1998. Initially, plans had been afoot to expand and renovate the old and now demolished Diekman stadium. However, with a growing fan capacity and with arguments that the location of the Diekman stadium was not strategic enough, the idea was conceived to build a new arena for the Twente fans. The Diekman ground also faced problems with its seating plans as a result of the FIFA regulations, which impose a requirement to construct a seating stand behind each goal.

The cost of the construction is estimated to be around 33 million guilders, and the stadium took 14 months to complete, with its foundation stone having been laid on 31 January 1997. Due to the tight budget available, the layout of the stadium was constructed so that future expansions are possible without the necessity to tear down entire existing stands.

On 10 May 1998, the first match played at the stadium resulted in a 3–0 victory by the home team against PSV in an Eredivisie match.

Initially, the Grolsch Veste had a capacity of 13,500 spectators, which was later reduced to 13,250. As of the start of the 2008–09 season, the stadium has been expanded with a partial second ring increasing the capacity to 24,000 seats. After a second expansion, completed in 2011, the current capacity became 30,205.

The recording of "You'll Never Walk Alone" by Gerry and the Pacemakers is sung along in the whole stadium before every kick-off.

On 7 July 2011, a section of the stadium roof collapsed whilst expansion work was taking place at the stadium, killing two people.

Current squad

Honours

National 
 Eredivisie
 Winners: 2009–10 
 Runners-up: 1973–74, 2008–09, 2010–11
 Eerste Divisie
 Winners: 2018–19
 KNVB Cup
 Winners: 1976–77, 2000–01, 2010–11
 Runners-up: 1974–75, 1978–79, 2003–04, 2008–09
 Johan Cruyff Shield
 Winners: 2010, 2011
 Runners-up: 2001

International 

 UEFA Cup
 Runners-up: 1974–75

Domestic results

Below is a table with Twente's domestic results since the introduction of the Eredivisie in 1956.

Club staff

Coaches 

 Friedrich Donenfeld (1 July 1965 – 30 June 1966)
 Kees Rijvers (1 July 1966 – 30 June 1972)
 Spitz Kohn (1 July 1972 – 30 September 1979)
 Hennie Hollink (1980–81)
 Rob Groener (1981–82)
 Spitz Kohn (1 November 1982 – 30 June 1983)
 Fritz Korbach (1 July 1983 – 30 June 1986)
 Theo Vonk (1 July 1986 – 30 June 1992)
 Rob Baan (1 July 1992 – 30 June 1994)
 Issy ten Donkelaar (1 July 1994 – 19 November 1995)
 Fred Rutten (interim) (16 November 1995 – 15 January 1996)
 Hans Meyer (15 January 1996 – 5 September 1999)
 Fred Rutten (6 September 1999 – 30 June 2001)
 John van 't Schip (1 July 2001 – 10 July 2002)
 René Vandereycken (24 July 2002 – 17 May 2004)
 Rini Coolen (1 July 2004 – 1 February 2006)
 Jan van Staa (interim) (1 February 2006 – 30 June 2006)
 Fred Rutten (1 July 2006 – 30 June 2008)
 Steve McClaren (20 June 2008 – 30 June 2010)
 Michel Preud'homme (1 July 2010 – 30 June 2011)
 Co Adriaanse (1 July 2011 – 3 January 2012)
 Steve McClaren (5 January 2012 – 26 February 2013)
 Alfred Schreuder (interim) (26 February 2013 – 1 April 2013)
 Michel Jansen (interim) (1 April 2013 – 30 June 2014)
 Alfred Schreuder (1 July 2014 – 31 August 2015)
 René Hake (31 August 2015 – 18 October 2017)
 Marino Pušić (interim) (18 October 2017 – 29 October 2017)
 Gertjan Verbeek (29 October 2017 – 26 March 2018)
 Marino Pušić (26 March 2018 – 31 May 2019)
 Gonzalo Recoba (1 July 2019 – 1 June 2020)
 Ron Jans (17 June 2020 – present)

Notable (former) players 

The players below had senior international cap(s) for their respective countries. Players whose name is listed in bold represented their countries while playing for FC Twente.

 Lindon Selahi
 Ramiz Zerrouki
 Marko Arnautović
 Marc Janko
 Roland Kollmann
 David Carney
 Jason Čulina
 Nikita Rukavytsya
 Luke Wilkshire
 Dedryck Boyata
 Jurgen Cavens
 Nacer Chadli
 Stein Huysegems
 Frédéric Peiremans
 Danilo
 Nikolay Mihaylov
 Rahim Ouédraogo
 Cristian Cuevas
 Felipe Gutiérrez
 Bryan Ruiz
 Dario Vujičević
 Václav Černý
 Hans Aabech
 Michael Birkedal
 Andreas Bjelland
 Kasper Kusk
 Claus Nielsen
 Kenneth Perez
 Jan Sørensen
 Per Steffensen
 Përparim Hetemaj
 Fredrik Jensen
 Mika Lipponen
 Antti Sumiala
 Helmut Rahn
 Peter Niemeyer
 Rico Steinmann
 Giorgi Aburjania
 Giorgi Gakhokidze
 Prince Polley
 Konstantinos Loumpoutis
 Antal Nagy
 Arnar Viðarsson
 Nashat Akram
 Cheick Tioté
 Ryo Miyaichi
 Spitz Kohn
 Jesús Corona
 Luka Đorđević
 Karim El Ahmadi
 Ismaïl Aissati
 Faouzi El Brazi
 Anouar Diba
 Adil Ramzi
 Hakim Ziyech
 Otman Bakkal
 Ronald de Boer
 Sander Boschker
 John Bosman
 Paul Bosvelt
 Edson Braafheid
 Wout Brama
 Arnold Bruggink
 Romano Denneboom
 Epi Drost
 Eljero Elia
 Orlando Engelaar
 Leroy Fer
 Erik ten Hag
 Kees van Ierssel
 Theo Janssen
 Collins John
 Ola John
 Luuk de Jong
 René van de Kerkhof
 Willy van de Kerkhof
 Denny Landzaat
 Adam Maher
 Andy van der Meyde
 Michael Mols
 Arnold Mühren
 Youri Mulder
 René Notten
 Arthur Numan
 Heini Otto
 Niels Oude Kamphuis
 Theo Pahlplatz
 Marcel Peeper
 Quincy Promes
 Fred Rutten
 Dick Schoenaker
 Theo Snelders
 Frans Thijssen
 Kick van der Vall
 Dwight Tiendalli
 Orlando Trustfull
 Jan Vennegoor of Hesselink
 Paul Verhaegh
 Sander Westerveld
 Peter Wisgerhof
 Tyronne Ebuehi
 Hallvar Thoresen
 Renato Tapia
 Mateusz Klich
 Daniel Fernandes
 Dmitri Bulykin
 Scott Booth
 Slobodan Rajković
 Dušan Tadić
 Miroslav Stoch
 Haris Vučkić
 Kamohelo Mokotjo
 Bernard Parker
 Emir Bajrami
 Kennedy Bakırcıoğlu
 Rasmus Bengtsson
 Daniel Majstorović
 Sharbel Touma
 Blaise Nkufo
 Oguchi Onyewu
 Roberto Rosales
 Zvonko Bego
 Spira Grujić
 Mitar Mrkela
 Spasoje Samardžić

Top scorers

Women's section

The women's section of Twente was founded in 2007 for the creation of the Eredivisie as new top-level league in the Netherlands. Twente played the opening match of the league. After three midfield positions in the first three years, Twente won the championship in 2010–11 and played the UEFA Women's Champions League in 2011–12.

See also 
 Dutch football league teams
 Derby of Twente
 Jong FC Twente

References

External links 

Official websites
 FCTwente.nl
 YouTube Channel Official video channel

General fan sites
 FC Twente Online 
 FC Twente Online English Section
 Vak-P 
 Twentefans 

News sites
 SkySports.com / FC Twente
 Goal.com / FC Twente
 Football-Lineups.com / FC Twente

 
Association football clubs established in 1965
1965 establishments in the Netherlands
Football clubs in the Netherlands
Football clubs in Enschede